Ruslan Fyodorovich Alekhno (born October 14, 1981) is a Belarusian-Russian singer who rose to popularity after winning Narodniy Artist – 2, the Russian version of Pop Idol. Alekhno received the Medal of Francysk Skaryna in 2019.

Early life
Ruslan Alekhno was born in October 14, 1981, in Babruysk, Byelorussian SSR, USSR now Belarus. Alekhno grew up in a military family, his father was a military officer. Although Alekhno only has one younger brother, he grew up alongside a total of 23 cousins. As a child, Alekhno was interested in music and took classes to play bayan and trumpet. When he was 16, Alekhno wrote his first musical composition. The role of the only spectator and critic as well was given to his mother.

Alekhno graduated the Babruysk State Auto-Transport College with a degree in transport planning. Subsequently, he was drafted into the Belarusian army. During his service, he was invited to become part of the Belarusian Armed Forces Academic Song and Dance Ensemble after one of the solists had heard his singing voice at an evening activity. Alekhno stayed into the Ensemble for four years, before decided to leave the army to pursue a solo career in music.

Career

Early career
In 2001, Ruslan Alekhno was the winner of the Belarusian TV project Hit-Moment, and in 2003 he was the winner in "Clear Voice" nomination at the "Crossroads of Europe Festival" in Belarus and was also the laureate of "Molodechno-2003" vocal contest in Belarus. In 2004, he also won the second prize in the International Malvy Festival in Poland. In 2005, together with Aleksey Goman, winner of Narodniy Artist – 1, he was the prize winner of Festival of Patriotic songs with "This is my Homeland", devoted to Victory anniversary.

Ruslan Alekhno won the Russian TV project Narodniy Artist – 2 (in Russian Народный артист – 2, translated as People's Artist – 2, the Russian version of Pop Idol). Upon his victory, he released his first studio album Rano ili pozdno (Sooner or later) in 2005.

Eurovision 2008

In 2008, Ruslan Alekhno became the winner of National Television Musical project EuroFest, the Belarusian annual competition to decide who would sing for the Republic of Belarus at the Eurovision Song Contest.

Emerging as the victor, he went on to represent Belarus in the 2008 Eurovision Song Contest in Belgrade, Serbia. Alekhno sang in the second semi-final elimination round on May 22, 2008, singing "Hasta la Vista", but failed to qualify to the final.

2008-present
In 2012, Alekhno began a new creative phase, recording new songs and working on a new show. His new song "Ne zabyt'" was in rotation on radio stations, and a new video was released, as well as his next single "My ostanemsya".

In May 2013, he released album of war songs Nasledie, which included the famous Russian songs of the Great Patriotic War. According to Ruslan, his new album is a tribute to all veterans of World War II. Ruslan dedicates it to all grandparents, who fought against fascism.

On May 26, 2013, International Academy of Public Recognition presented Ruslan Alekhno with the Award "For contribution to the development of Russian culture."

In 2014, Alekhno released the single "Serdtse iz stekla" featuring Russian singer Valeriya. Its music video was released in Spring 2014.

In 2015, Alekhno won the TV show "Odin v odin!", the Russian version of "Your Face Sounds Familiar".

In 2019, he participated in The Voice of Russia. During the Blind Auditions, he sang Jaak Joala's "Podberu muzyku" and did not manage to let any of the coaches turn. One of the coaches, Konstantin Meladze, called Alekhno a "restaurant singer, who you listen to when you are drunk", causing a stir in the Belarusian media. Alekhno later said that he was happy that he did not pass the audition phase and he had little interest in the show. He admitted getting onto the show purely for the fee that Channel One had offered for his participation and said that the producers of the show had been trying to get him to participate for multiple seasons straight.

Awards
2000 Winner of contest "Viva Victory"
2001 First Prize at the International Competition in Poland
2001 Grand Prix of the International Contest of patriotic songs Russia
2002 Laureate of the Belarusian Song and poetry
2003 Second Prize at the "Golden Hit"
2003 "Clear Voice" reward at festival "Crossroads of Europe"
2004 Second Prize of the International Festival of "Mallow" (Poland)
2004 Winner of the TV channel Russia contest "People's Artist – 2"
2005 First Prize of the All-Russian competition of patriotic songs
2013 The Award "For contribution to the development of Russian culture"
2015 Winner of the TV show "Odin v Odin!"
2019 Award of Francysk Skaryna
2021 Honored Artist of the Republic of Belarus
2022 "Chanson of the Year" Award
2022 "Song of the Year" Award

Personal life
Ruslan Alekhno was in a relationship with actress Irina Medvedeva between 2004 and 2011, being married 2009–2011. In 2016, Ruslan married again. His second wife is Yulia Alekhno. In 2017-03-31 a daughter Varvara was born from this marriage.

Alekhno is an Eastern Orthodox believer. He prays every day and vows to go to mass every single Sunday.

Although he was initially reluctant to speak about the 2020-2021 Belarusian protests, Alekhno later took part in the anti-protest song "Lyubimuyu ne otdayut". He however refused to reveal on whom he had voted during the 2020 Belarusian presidential election. Alekhno is considered to be part of the inner circle of Alexander Lukashenko and was seen celebrating New Year's Eve with him in 2020. Alekhno criticised artists withdrawing from and boycotting the 2021 Slavianski Bazaar.

Discography

Albums
Rano ili Pozdno (Sooner Or Later) (2005)
Hasta La Vista (2008)
Nasledie (Heritage) (2013)
Ruslan Alehno (2015)
Ya Podaryu Tebe Lyubov (I'll Give You My Love) (2017)
Moya Dusha (My Soul) (2019)

Music Videos
2005: "Neobyknovennaya" – Trio with Alexey Chumakov and Aleksandr Panayotov
2007: "Serdtse Zemli Moyei" – Duet with Irina Dorofeeva
2008: "Hasta La Vista"
2012: "Ne Zabyt"
2013: "Lyubimaya"
2014: "Heart of Glass" – Duet with Valeriya
2017: "Spasibo" (Thanks) — OST of movie Red Dog
2017: "Samaya Milaya" — Duet with Yaroslav Sumishevsky
2018: "Samaya-Samaya" (You're the most)
2019: "My Zhivyom" (We're living)

Singles
2005: "Neobiknovennaya" (Необыкновенная, Unusual Girl) – Trio with Alexey Chumakov and Aleksandr Panayotov
2007: "Serdtse Zemli Moyei" (Сердце Земли Моей, Heart of my Land) (duet with Irina Dorofeeva)
2008: "Hasta la Vista"
2009: "Mroja" (Dream)
2012: "Ne Zabyt'" (Не Забыть, Can't Be Forgotten)
2012: "My Ostanemsya" (Мы Останемся, We'll stay)
2013: "Lyubimaya" (Любимая, Beloved)
2014: "Serdtse Iz Stekla" (Сердце Из Стекла, Heart Of Glass") (feat Valeriya)

See also
Belarus in the Eurovision Song Contest

References

External links

 
 
Ruslan Alekhno Eurovision 2008 page

1981 births
Eurovision Song Contest entrants for Belarus
21st-century Belarusian male singers
Eurovision Song Contest entrants of 2008
Idols (TV series) winners
Living people
People from Babruysk